Minorities in Iraq include various ethnic and religious groups.

Kurds

Kurds are an Indo-European people of the Iranic branch. The vast majority of Kurds are Sunni Muslims, with Shia and Alevi minorities. There are also a small number of adherents to native Kurdish/Iranian religions like Yarsanism. Some Kurdish Communists and Socialists are Atheist.

Under the Kingdom of Iraq, Kurdish leader Mustafa Barzani led a rebellion against the central government in Baghdad in 1945. After the failure of the uprising Barzānī and his followers fled to the Soviet Union. In the 1960s, when Iraqi Brigadier Abdul-Karim Qassem distanced himself from Egyptian president Gamal Abdel Nasser, he faced growing opposition from pro-Egypt officers in the Iraqi army. When the garrison in Mosul rebelled against Qassem's policies, he allowed Barzānī to return from exile to help suppress the pro-Nasser rebels. By 1961, Barzānī and the Kurds began a full-scale rebellion.

When the Ba'ath Party took power in Iraq, the new government, in order to end the Kurdish revolt, granted the Kurds their own limited autonomy. However, for various reasons, including the pro-Iranian sympathies of some Kurds during the Iran–Iraq War in the 1980s, the regime implemented anti-Kurdish policies and a de facto civil war broke out. From March 29, 1987 until April 23, 1989, the infamous Al-Anfal campaign, a systematic genocide of the Kurdish people in Iraq, was launched. For this, Iraq was widely condemned by the international community, but was never seriously punished for oppressive measures, including the use of chemical weapons against the Kurds, which resulted in thousands of deaths.

After the Persian Gulf War, the Kurds began another uprising against the Ba'athists. The revolt was violently put down. During the same year, Turkey, fighting Kurds on its on territory, bombed Kurdish areas in Northern Iraq, claiming that bases for the terrorist Kurdistan Workers Party were located in the region. However, the 2003 invasion of Iraq and the fall of Saddam, brought renewed hope to the Kurds. The newly elected Iraqi government agreed to re-establish the Kurdistan Regional Government in Northern Iraq. The Kurds have since been working towards developing the area and pushing for democracy in the country. However, most Kurds overwhelmingly favor becoming an independent nation. "In the January 2005 Iraqi elections, 98.7 percent of Kurds voted for full independence rather than reconciliation with Iraq." Almost no other political or social group in the region is agreeable to the idea of Kurdish independence. Iraq's neighboring countries such as Turkey are particularly opposed to the movement because they fear that an independent Iraqi Kurdistan would strengthen Kurdish independence movements in their own territories.

Nouri al-Maliki was at loggerheads with the leader of ethnic Kurds, who brandished the threat of secession in a growing row over the symbolic issue of flying the Iraqi national flag at government buildings in the autonomous Kurdish north. Maliki's Arab Shi'ite-led government was locked in a dispute with the autonomous Kurdish regional government, which has banned the use of the Iraqi state flag on public buildings. The prime minister issued a blunt statement on Sunday saying: "The Iraqi flag is the only flag that should be raised over any square inch of Iraq." But Mesud Barzani, president of the Iraqi Kurdistan region, told the Kurdish parliament the national leadership were "failures" and that the Iraqi flag was a symbol of his people's past oppression by Baghdad: "If at any moment we, the Kurdish people and parliament, consider that it is in our interests to declare independence, we will do so and we will fear no one." The dispute exposes a widening rift between Arabs and Kurds, the second great threat to Iraq's survival as a state after the growing sectarian conflict between Arab Sunnis and Shi'ites.

Turkmen

The Iraqi Turkmen are the third largest ethnic group in the country, after the Arabs and Kurds. They are a branch of the Turkic peoples and adhere to that heritage and identity, this is because most Iraqi Turkmen/Turkoman are the descendants of the Ottoman soldiers, traders and civil servants who were brought into Iraq from Anatolia during the rule of the Ottoman Empire. Since the demise of the Ottoman Empire, the Iraqi Turkmen/Turkoman have found themselves increasingly discriminated against from the policies of successive regimes, such as the Kirkuk Massacre of 1923, 1947, 1959, and in 1979 when the Ba'ath Party discriminated against the community. Although the Turks were recognized as a constitutive entity of Iraq (alongside the Arabs and Kurds) in the constitution of 1925, the Iraqi Turkmen/Turkoman were later denied this status.

According to the 1957 Iraqi census the Turkmen/Turkoman had a population of 567,000, accounting for 9% of the total Iraqi population. By 2013, the Iraqi Ministry of Planning said that there were 3 million Turkmen/Turkoman, out of a population of 34.7 million, forming 8.65% of the population. The Turkmen/Turkoman minority mainly reside in northern and central Iraq, in the so-called Turkmeneli region – which is a political term used by the Turkmen/Turkoman to define the vast swath of territory in which they have historically had a dominant population. In particular, the Turkmen/Turkoman consider the capital of Turkmeneli to be Kirkuk and its boundaries also include Tal Afar, Mosul, Erbil, Mandali, and Tuz Khurmatu. According to Liam Anderson and Gareth Stansfield, the Turkmen/Turkoman note that the term "Turcomania" – an Anglicized version of "Turkmeneli" – appears on a map of the region published by William Guthrie in 1785, however, there is no clear reference to Turkmeneli until the end of the twentieth century. According to Khalil Osman there has been "a raft of federalist schemes" proposed by various Turkmen/Turkoman political parties.

The Iraqi Turkmen/Turkoman share close cultural and linguistic ties with Turkey, particularly the Anatolian region. They are predominately Muslims, formed of a majority Sunni population (about 60%-70%) but there is also a significant number of Turkmen/Turkoman practicing the Shia branch of Islam (about 30% to 40%). Nonetheless, the Turkmen are mainly secular, having internalized the secularist interpretation practiced in the Republic of Turkey. The minority speak their own dialect of Turkish, which is often called "Turkmen". This dialect was influenced by Ottoman Turkish from 1534 onwards, but also by Persian during the brief capture of Baghdad in 1624; thereafter, in 1640, the Turkish varieties continued to be influenced by Ottoman Turkish, as well as other languages in the region, such as Arabic and Kurdish. Some linguists have suggested that the dialect spoken by Turkmen/Turkoman is similar to the South Azeri dialect used by the Turkish Yörük tribes in the Balkans and Anatolia. However, the Turkmen/Turkoman dialect is particularly close to the Turkish dialects of Diyarbakır and Urfa in south-eastern Turkey and Istanbul Turkish has long been the prestige dialect which has exerted a profound historical influence on their dialect. In addition, the Iraqi Turkmen/Turkoman grammar differs sharply from Irano-Turkic varieties, such as South Azeri and Afshar types. In 1997 the Turkmen/Turkoman adopted the Turkish alphabet as the formal written language and by 2005 the community leaders decided that the Turkish language would replace the Arabic script in Iraqi schools. The current prevalence of satellite television and media exposure from Turkey may have also led to the standardisation of Turkmeni towards Turkish, and the preferable language for adolescents associating with the Turkish culture.

Christians 

Christianity has a presence in Iraq dating to the 1st century AD. The Christian community in Iraq is relatively small, and further dwindled due to the Iraq War to just several thousands. Most Christians in Iraq belong traditionally to Syriac Orthodox Church, Chaldean Catholic Church and the Assyrian Church of the East, and are concentrated in small cities in the Nineveh Plains, such as Alqosh, Tel Keppe, Ankawa, and Bartella.

Assyrians

The Akkadian influenced Aramaic-speaking Assyrians are the indigenous people of Iraq and descendants of those who ruled ancient Akkad, Assyria and Babylonia. More generally speaking, the Assyrians (like the Mandeans) are descendants of the ancient Mesopotamians (Sumer, Akkad, Assyria, Babylon, Adiabene, Osroene and Hatra). They speak dialects of the Aramaic of the Assyrian and Babylonian Empires and have their own written script. They began to convert to Christianity in the 1st and 2nd centuries AD formerly having followed the ancient Sumerian-Akkadian religion (also known as Ashurism). There are believed to be no more than 500,000 Assyrians remaining in Iraq, with a large concentration in the diaspora. They are Iraq's fourth largest ethnic group after the Arabs, the Kurds and the Iraqi Turkmen.

The Assyrian minority came under persecution during Saddam Hussein's Ba'athist regime. When Hussein first assumed power, the Assyrian population there numbered 2 million to 2.5 million. Many have fled to neighboring countries such as Jordan and Syria, or have emigrated to Europe and the U.S. The United Nations High Commission for Refugees reports that half a million Iraqi Christians have registered for temporary asylum in Syria. Assyrians have traditionally made good soldiers, during the Iran–Iraq War, many were recruited to the armies of both sides.

Currently, Assyrians face persecution from Kurds, as Kurdification attempts at Assyrian cities are in progress. This was after the Kurdish takeover of Assyrian towns in the Kurdistan region (such as Zakho, Ainkawa, Aqrah, etc.) and the forceful deportation and killing of Christians in that area.

The Assyrian Security force Nineveh Plain Protection Units Currently run the security in many Towns and Villages in the Nineveh Plains

Armenians

The Armenians are Orthodox Christians. Armenians have a long history of association with Mesopotamia, going back to pre-Christian times. The Armenians have historically been a thriving community in Iraq with football clubs (Nadi Armeni) and other establishments. Armenian folk music and dance is admired in Iraq. Most Iraqi Armenians live in Baghdad, Mosul, and Basra and their population is estimated at around 10,000 down from 70,000 before the 2003 invasion of Iraq.

Other groups

Feylis

Feylis are a distance ethnic Kurdish group who live near the Iraq-Iran border, in Wasit, Diyala, Maysan. There are also big Feyli community in Baghdad. In the mid 1970s, Iraq expelled around 40,000 Feyli's who had lived for generations near Baghdad and Khanaqin, alleging that they were Iranian nationals. However, since 2003 many Feyli kurds have returned to Iraq and been granted Iraqi citizenship.

Jews

Although historically significant, the Jewish community of Iraq today is very small in number. Almost all Iraqi Jews were transferred to Israel in the early 1950s in Operation Ezra and Nehemiah.

Mandaeans

The oldest independent confirmation of Mandaean existence in the region is Kartir's inscription at Ka'ba-ye Zartosht and there is archaeological evidence that attests to the Mandaean presence in pre-Islamic Iraq. The Mandaeans were originally native speakers of Mandaic, an Eastern Aramaic language, before many switched to colloquial Iraqi Arabic.

The Iraqi Mandaean community, in the pre-1990 Gulf War period, was the most important in the world with 30,000–50,000 of the 70,000 total living in the country mainly in the area around the Tigris and Euphrates rivers. Mandaeans, although an ethnic and religious minority, consider themselves Iraqi and have supported the Iraqi nation patriotically. They were considered an economically successful community, and had achieved high levels in Iraqi society, and are held in high regard as silversmiths, goldsmiths, academics and poets.

Marsh Arabs

The Marsh Arabs or Ma'dãn are a group of Arabs who number 125,000 to 150,000 who live in the Mesopotamian Marshes in southern Iraq.

Kaka'is

The Kaka'is are a small Kurdish religious group who located mainly in and around Kirkuk in northern Iraq.

Shabaks

There are about 60,000–400,000 Shabaks in Iraq. They are an ethnic and religious minority, retaining their own distinct Pre Islamic religion. They are an Indo-European (Aryan) people and speak an Indo-European language with elements of Turkish and Arabic infused. The Shabak's origin are not well-known, many notables such as Anastas Al-Karmali have argued that the Shabak People were of Kurdish origins. The Encyclopaedia of Islam's 'First Edition' from 1913-1936, states that the Shabaks are "a religious community of Kurdish origin in the wilāyet of Mawṣil."

Despite having their own language and culture unique from other groups, Kurdish authorities have attempted to Kurdify the Shabaks by occupying Shabak villages and referring to them as "Kurdish Shabaks". In 2005, two Assyrians were killed and four Shabaks were wounded by the KDP during a demonstration organized by the Democratic Shabak Coalition, a group which wants separate representation for the Shabak community.

Roma (Gypsy)

Iraq's Roma (Kawliya) ethnic minority was looked down upon as second-class citizens under Ba'ath party rule.

Ezidis

Today, there are around 650,000 Yezidis in Iraq who live in northern parts of Iraq. All speak Kurdish with the exception of the two villages Bashiqa and Bahzani, located near Mosul. Most Yezidis live in southern Kurdistan (Northern Iraq, the Sheikhan area near Mosul, the Sinjar mountains), southwestern Kurdistan (Northern Syria), northwestern Kurdistan (southeastern Turkey), as well as in Armenia, Georgia, Russia, the Ukraine, the USA, Germany and other countries of Western Europe. the majority consider themselves ethnically Kurdish, although Yazidis are religiously distinct from Iraq's predominantly Sunni Kurdish population. Yezidism has roots in a western Pre-Zoroastrian religion

Africans 

The Iraqis of largely African descent live mostly around the city of Basra, having been brought to the region as slaves over one thousand years ago to work the sugarcane plantations then in existence. Although they are Muslims and Arabic-speakers, Afro-Iraqis also retain some cultural and religious traditions from their ancestral homeland. They suffer considerable discrimination due to their race, and, as a result, are restricted to working as entertainers or menial laborers. Moreover, they are often addressed by other Iraqis as 'abd, meaning "slave". In the mid-9th century, black slaves around Basra rose in a rebellion, conquering their former masters and ruling the city for 15 years before being put down by forces sent by the Caliph in Baghdad. After the fall of the Saddam Hussein regime, Afro-Iraqis have once again begun to struggle for an improvement in their condition.

Ajam (Persians)

Baháʼís

Bedouin

Circassians

Assaults on minority Groups since 2003
 In August 2014, ISIL attempted ethnic cleansing against the Yezidis and Assyrians.
 In total, 40 churches have been bombed since June 26, 2004.
 August 10, 2009: Truck bombs kill at least 28 people in the Shabak village of Khazna, in Nineveh governorate
 June 20, 2009: Truck bomb kills at least 70 people in a Turkmen village near Kirkuk
 Chaldean Catholic Archbishop Paulos Faraj Rahho was kidnapped on February 23, 2008. Three of his companions were also murdered during the kidnapping. His body was found in March, and an Iraqi Al-Qaeda leader, Ahmed Ali Ahmed, known as Abu Omar, was sentenced to death in May for this crime.
 January 9, 2008: 2 Assyrian churches bombed in Kirkuk.
 January 6, 2008: 7 Assyrian churches bombed: three churches in Mosul and four in Baghdad.
 August 14, 2007: Bombing of Qahtaniya and Jazeera - killed 796 people and wounded 1,562, targeting the Yazidi minority.
 June 4, 2007: 2 churches attacked, Ragheed Ganni, a priest, and three men were shot dead in church.
 October 2006: Orthodox priest, Boulos Iskander, kidnapped in Mosul and subsequently beheaded, and his arms and legs were cut off.
 January 29, 2006: 4 churches bombed.
 January 2005: Syriac Catholic Archbishop of Mosul, Basile Georges Casmoussa, kidnapped on January 17 and released.
 December 7, 2004: 2 churches bombed.
 November 8, 2004: 1 church bombed.
 October 16, 2004: 5 churches bombed.
 September 10 and 11th, 2004: 2 churches bombed.
 August 1, 2004: 5 Assyrian and 1 Armenian churches bombed.

See also
 Politics of Iraq
 Demographics of Iraq
 History of Iraq

References

External links
 Still Targeted: Continued Persecution of Iraq's Minorities, Report by Minority Rights Group International
 Iraqi Minorities Council
 Assimilation, Exodus, Eradication: Iraq's minority communities since 2003, Report by Minority Rights Group International
 The Constitution of Iraq: Religious and Ethnic Relations, Study by Minority Rights Group International

Iraq